Wells railway station may refer to

In Norfolk, England:
 Wells railway station, Norfolk, on the narrow gauge Wells and Walsingham Light Railway
 Wells-On-Sea railway station, a disused station in Wells-next-the-Sea

In Somerset, England:
 Wells East Somerset railway station, the disused station constructed by the East Somerset Railway, later the Great Western Railway goods depot
 Wells (Priory Road) railway station, the disused station constructed by the Somerset and Dorset Joint Railway
 Wells (Tucker Street) railway station, the disused station constructed by the Bristol and Exeter Railway, later operated by the Great Western Railway

In the United States:
 Wells Regional Transportation Center, in Wells, Maine
 Wells Street Station, the terminal of the Chicago and North Western Railway
 Wells Street Terminal, the terminal of the Chicago Aurora and Elgin Railroad